Sphenomorphus leptofasciatus is a species of skink. It is found in Papua New Guinea.

Sphenomorphus leptofasciatus is often found in or under decaying foliage and logs. It is the only skink species that the Kalam people of Papua New Guinea do not consume, although the Kalam frequently consume other skink species.

Names
It is known as ñgñolom in the Kalam language of Papua New Guinea.

References

leptofasciatus
Reptiles described in 1974
Skinks of New Guinea
Endemic fauna of New Guinea